The discography of the Promise Ring, an American rock band, consists of four studio albums, six extended plays and two singles.

Studio albums

Extended plays

Singles

Other appearances

Music videos

References

Discographies of American artists